Cantlay is a surname. Notable people with the surname include:

Charles Cantlay (born 1954), British businessman and cricketer
Patrick Cantlay (born 1992), American golfer

See also
Cantley (disambiguation)